The Maharana Pratap Medical College (also called M.P. Medical College) is one among the 36 Medical colleges for homoeopathy in Central India. It is affiliated to Pt. Ravishankar Shukla University, Raipur.

See also
 Madhya Pradesh College of Homoeopathy, Raipur.

References

Universities and colleges in Chhattisgarh
Education in Raipur, Chhattisgarh
Homeopathic colleges
Memorials to Maharana Pratap